Fea Jur is the second album by St. Louis band Lye By Mistake, and was released on October 13, 2009.  The album was produced by both the band, as well as Brian Sheffer. It was released on the Boston-based record label, Black Market Activities.  The artwork was created by Lamb Grenade

Track listing
"Big Red Button" - 4:04
"The Condition" - 6:08
"Invincible Bad Ass" - 5:45
"Vanguard to Nowhere" - 8:52
"Stag" - 5:25
"Fea Jur" - 7:12
"Missouri Tomater" - 1:26
"Money Eating Mary (Karaoke Remix)" - 11:04

Personnel
Johnnie Truesdale - bass
Josh Bauman - guitar
Drew Button - drums/percussion
Lye By Mistake - Producer
Lamb Grenade - Artwork
Brian Scheffer - Producer, Engineer

References

2009 albums
Lye By Mistake albums